Humphrey of Lancaster, Duke of Gloucester (3 October 1390 – 23 February 1447) was an English prince, soldier and literary patron. He was (as he styled himself) "son, brother and uncle of kings", being the fourth and youngest son of Henry IV of England, the brother of Henry V, and the uncle of Henry VI. Gloucester fought in the Hundred Years' War and acted as Lord Protector of England during the minority of his nephew. A controversial figure, he has been characterised as reckless, unprincipled, and fractious, but is also noted for his intellectual activity and for being the first significant English patron of humanism, in the context of the Renaissance.

Unlike his brothers, Humphrey was given no major military command by his father, instead receiving an intellectual upbringing. Created Duke of Gloucester in 1414, he participated in Henry V's campaigns during the Hundred Years' War in France: he fought at Agincourt in 1415 and at the conquest of Normandy in 1417–9. Following the king's death in 1422, Gloucester became one of the leading figures in the regency government of the infant Henry VI. He proved a rash, impulsive, unscrupulous, and troublesome figure: he quarreled constantly with his brother, John, Duke of Bedford, and uncle, Cardinal Henry Beaufort, and went so far as to violently prosecute a dispute with the Duke of Burgundy, a key English ally in France, over conflicting claims to lands in the Low Countries. At home, Gloucester never fully achieved his desired dominance, while his attempts to gain a foreign principality for himself were fruitless.

A staunch opponent of concessions in the French conflict, and a proponent of offensive warfare, Gloucester increasingly lost favour among the political community, and King Henry VI himself after the end of his minority, following a series of setbacks on the war in France. The trial in 1441 of Eleanor Cobham, his second wife, under charges of witchcraft, destroyed Gloucester's political influence. In 1447, he himself was accused, probably falsely, of treason, and died a few days later while under arrest.

Humphrey was the exemplar of the romantic chivalric persona. Mettled and courageous, he was a foil for the countess Jacqueline of Hainaut, his first wife. His learned, widely read, scholarly approach to the early renaissance cultural expansion demonstrated the quintessential well-rounded princely character. He was a paragon for Eton College and an exemplar for the University of Oxford, accomplished, diplomatic, with political cunning. 

Despite the errors in both his public and private life, and the mischief he caused in politics, Gloucester is also at times praised as a patron of learning and a benefactor to the University of Oxford. He was popular among the literary figures of his age for his scholarly activity, and with the common people for his advocacy of a spirited foreign policy. For these causes, he was known as the "good Duke Humphrey".

Diplomatic and military career

The place of his birth is unknown, but he was named after his maternal grandfather, Humphrey de Bohun, 7th Earl of Hereford. He was the youngest in a powerful quadrumvirate of brothers, who were very close companions; on 20 March 1413, Henry and Humphrey had been at their dying father's bedside. Thomas, John and Humphrey had all been knighted in 1399. They joined the Order of the Garter together in 1400.

During the reign of Henry IV, Humphrey received a scholar's education, while his elder brothers fought on the Welsh and Scottish borders. Following his father's death he was created Duke of Gloucester in 1414, and Chamberlain of England, and he took his seat in Parliament. He became a member of the Privy Council in 1415. Before embarking for France, the army camped at Southampton, where the Earl of Cambridge failed in an assassination plot to kill the king. Humphrey and his brother, the Duke of Clarence, led an Inquiry of Lords to try Cambridge and Scrope for high treason on 5 August.

During Henry V's campaigns in France, Humphrey gained a reputation as a successful commander. His knowledge of siege warfare, gained from his classical studies, contributed to the fall of Honfleur. During the Battle of Agincourt Humphrey was wounded; as he fell, the king sheltered him, and withstood a determined assault from French knights. For his services, Humphrey was granted offices including Constable of Dover, Warden of the Cinque Ports on 27 November, and King's Lieutenant. His tenure in government was peaceful and successful. This period commenced with Emperor Sigismund's peace mission, the only visit of a medieval emperor to England. According to Holinshed's Chronicles, Humphrey was the principal actor in a symbolic ceremony. He welcomed the emperor on the shoreline with a sword in his hand, "extorting" from Sigismund the renunciation of his prerogatives of dominion over the king of England before allowing him to land on the evening of 1 May 1416.

The Treaty of "eternal friendship" signed at Canterbury on 15 August served only to anticipate renewed hostility from France.

Upon the death of his brother in 1422, Humphrey became Lord Protector to his young nephew Henry VI. He also claimed the right to the regency of England following the death of his elder brother, John, Duke of Bedford, in 1435. Humphrey's claims were strongly contested by the lords of the king's council, and in particular his half-uncle, Cardinal Henry Beaufort. Henry V's will, rediscovered at Eton College in 1978, actually supported Humphrey's claims. In 1436 Philip, Duke of Burgundy, attacked Calais. Duke Humphrey was appointed garrison commander. The Flemings assaulted from the landward but the English resistance was stubborn. Humphrey marched the army to Baillieul, taking the English to safety; he threatened St. Omer before sailing home.

Humphrey was consistently popular with the citizens of London and the Commons. He also had a widespread reputation as a patron of learning and the arts. His popularity with the people and his ability to keep the peace earned him the appointment of Chief Justice of South Wales. However, his unpopular marriage to Eleanor Cobham became ammunition for his enemies. Eleanor was arrested and tried for sorcery and heresy in 1441, and Humphrey retired from public life. He himself was arrested on a charge of treason on 20 February 1447. He died at Bury St Edmunds in Suffolk three days later, and was buried at St Albans Abbey, adjacent to St Alban's shrine. At the time, some suspected that he had been poisoned, though it is more probable that he died of a stroke.

Marriages

He married twice but left no surviving legitimate progeny.

First marriage: Jacqueline, Countess of Hainaut and Holland
In about 1423 he married Jacqueline, Countess of Hainaut and Holland (died 1436), daughter of William VI, Count of Hainaut. Through this marriage Gloucester assumed the title "Count of Holland, Zeeland and Hainault", and briefly fought to retain these titles when they were contested by Jacqueline's cousin Philip the Good (see: War of Succession in Holland). They had a stillborn child in 1424. The marriage was annulled in 1428, and Jacqueline died (disinherited) in 1436.

Second marriage: Eleanor Cobham
In 1428 Humphrey married, secondly, Eleanor Cobham, his mistress, who in 1441 was tried and convicted of practising witchcraft against the king in an attempt to retain power for her husband. She was condemned to public penance followed by exile and life imprisonment. The marriage was without progeny.

Children
By mistresses unknown Humphrey had two illegitimate children. Eleanor Cobham was possibly the mother of one or both, before their marriage. Due to their illegitimacy, they were unable to succeed to their father's titles. The illegitimate children were:
Arthur Plantagenet (died after 1447)
Antigone Plantagenet, who married firstly Henry Grey, 2nd Earl of Tankerville, Lord of Powys (c. 1419–1450) and secondly John d'Amancier.

Legacy

After inheriting the manor of Greenwich, Gloucester enclosed Greenwich Park and from 1428 had a palace built there on the banks of the Thames, known as Bella Court and later as the Palace of Placentia. The Duke Humphrey Tower surmounting Greenwich Park was demolished in the 1660s and the site was chosen for building the Royal Observatory. His name lives on in Duke Humfrey's Library, part of the Bodleian Library in Oxford University, and in Duke Humphrey Road on Blackheath, south of Greenwich. Duke Humphrey was a patron and protector of Oxford, donating more than 280 manuscripts to the University. The possession of such a library did much to stimulate new learning.

Duke Humphrey was also a patron of literature, notably of the poet John Lydgate and of John Capgrave. He corresponded with many leading Italian humanists and commissioned translations of Greek classics into Latin. His friendship with Zano Castiglione, Bishop of Bayeux, led to many further connections on the Continent, including Leonardo Bruni, Pietro Candido Decembrio and Tito Livio Frulovisi. Duke Humphrey also patronised the Abbey of St Albans.

Duke Humphrey's Walk was the name of an aisle in Old St Paul's Cathedral near to what was popularly believed to be Duke Humphrey's tomb, though, according to W. Carew Hazlitt, it was, in reality, a monument to John Lord Beauchamp de Warwick (died 1360). This was an area frequented by thieves and beggars. The phrase "to dine with Duke Humphrey" was used of poor people who had no money for a meal, in reference to this. Saki updates the phrase by referring to a "Duke Humphrey picnic", one without food, in his short story "The Feast of Nemesis". In fact, Humphrey's tomb is in the Abbey of St Albans (the Cathedral): it was restored by Hertfordshire Freemasons in 2000 to celebrate the millennium.

In literature

In Shakespeare's History plays, the portrayal of Humphrey is notable for being one of the most unambiguously sympathetic: in the War of the Roses Tetralogy, he is one of only a handful of historical personages to be portrayed in a uniformly positive light. He appears as a minor character in Henry IV, Part 2 and Henry V, but as a major character in two others: his conflict with Cardinal Beaufort is portrayed in Henry VI, Part 1, and his disgrace and death following his wife's alleged sorcery is depicted in Henry VI, Part 2. Shakespeare portrays Humphrey's death as a murder, ordered by William de la Pole, 1st Duke of Suffolk, and Queen Margaret of Anjou. 

The 1723 play Humphrey, Duke of Gloucester by Ambrose Philips revolves around the life of Gloucester. In the original Drury Lane production he was played by Barton Booth.

Margaret Frazer's 2003 historical mystery, The Bastard's Tale, revolves around the events surrounding Gloucester's arrest and death.

Titles, honours and arms
Duke of Gloucester; created in 1414 (second creation).
Earl of Pembroke; created in 1414 (fifth creation). The title was subsequently made hereditary, but defaulted to William de la Pole.
Lord Warden of the Cinque Ports, 1415.

Ancestry

References

Further reading
 
 Hollman, Gemma (2019). Royal Witches: From Joan of Navarre to Elizabeth Woodville. Cheltenham: The History Press.

 
 
 
 

|-

|-

 

1390 births
1447 deaths
14th-century English people
15th-century English politicians
15th-century viceregal rulers
Peers created by Henry V
Burials at St Albans Cathedral
Dukes of Gloucester
Earls of Pembroke
Governors of Jersey
Heirs to the English throne
House of Lancaster
Knights Bachelor
Knights of the Garter
Lords Protector of England
Lords Warden of the Cinque Ports
Male Shakespearean characters
Patrons of literature
Regents of England
Sons of kings
Children of Henry IV of England
Members of the Privy Council of England
Non-inheriting heirs presumptive